6A refers to Six Apart, a software company.

6A may also refer to:

 6A (Long Island bus)
 APP-6A, the NATO standard for military map marking symbols
 Franklin 6A, an engine powering the 1961 Maule M-4 aircraft
 Gemini 6A, a 1965 crewed spaceflight
 HCM-6A, a galaxy found in 2002
 Keratin 6A
 Precorrin-6A synthase (deacetylating), an enzyme
 Precorrin-6A reductase, an enzyme
 U.S. Route 6A
 Aviacsa IATA airline designator
6A, the production code for the 1982 Doctor Who serial Black Orchid

See also
A6 (disambiguation)